The Mike Lockwood Memorial Show was a professional wrestling memorial event produced by the Pro Wrestling Iron (PWI) promotion, which took place on November 15, 2003 at the Lathrop Community Center in Lathrop, California. It was the first of two memorial shows held in memory of Mike Lockwood, who committed suicide at his home in Navarre, Florida on two weeks earlier, with a second show, the Mike Lockwood Memorial Tournament, run by New Breed Wrestling Association in South Bend, Indiana two years later. All proceeds raised from the event, and subsequent DVD sales, were donated to Lockwood's widow Shannon and their 7-year-old daughter Patty. Six Japanese-style professional wrestling matches were featured on the event's card, though no gimmicks or ongoing storylines were part of the show.

The main event was a 6-man tag team match between Donovan Morgan, Frank Murdoch and Vinny Massaro, accompanied by Patty Lockwood, and Hook Bomberry and the Thomaselli Brothers (Vito and Sal Thomaselli). Another featured match was Pogo the Clown, competing without makeup and under his real name Joe Applebaumer, against Maliki, which Pogo won. "The Raging Bull" Manny Fernandez came out of retirement, at age 51, for a "one-night only" appearance to defeat Lars Dauger, and Mike Lockwood's original trainer Shane Kody teaming with Big Ugly to beat Bart Blaxton and Ryan Drago. All the wrestler's who participated on the show wore armbands with “Mikey” on them.

Results
November 15, 2003 in Lathrop, California (Lathrop Community Center)

References

External links
Mike Lockwood (1971-2003) Memorial Page at ProWrestlingIron.com
Mike Lockwood Memorial Show official results at ProWrestlingIron.com

2003 in professional wrestling
Professional wrestling memorial shows
Professional wrestling in California
Lathrop, California